Willie Ross (born in Scotland) was a Scottish football player and manager.

References

Scottish footballers
Airdrieonians F.C. (1878) players
Scottish Football League players
Derry City F.C. players
NIFL Premiership players
Cork United F.C. (1940–1948) players
League of Ireland players
Derry City F.C. managers
Portadown F.C. managers
1985 deaths
Year of birth missing
Cork City F.C. (1938–1940) players
Association football forwards
Scottish football managers